Mandera East Constituency is an electoral constituency in Kenya. It is one of six constituencies in Mandera County. The constituency was established for the 1966 elections. The constituency is largely settled by the Murule  community.

Members of Parliament 

{| class="wikitable"
|-
!Elections
!MP 
!Party
!Notes
|-
| 1966 || Sayid Mohamed Amin || KANU ||
|-
| 1969 || Sayid Mohamed Amin || KANU || One-party system
|-
| 1974 || Mohamed Sheikh Aden || KANU || One-party system
|- Murule
| 1979 || Mohamed Sheikh Aden || KANU || One-party system
|- 
| 1983 || Adan Mohamed Nooru || KANU || One-party system. 
|-
| 1988 || Mohamed Sheikh Aden || KANU || One-party system. 
|-
| 1992 || Abdullahi Sheikh Ahmed || PICK || 
|- Murule
| 1994 || Isaack Ali Shaaban || KANU || By-election
|- Murule
| 1997 || Isaack Ali Shaaban || KANU ||
|-
| 2002 || Isaack Ali Shaaban || KANU
|-
| 2007 || Mohamed Hussein Ali || ODM ||
|- Murule
| 2013 
|| Abdulaziz Ali arah || URP
|- 
| 2017 || Omar Mohamed - omar salla || EFP ||

[[2022 kenya general election 
  |2022]] || |  [ODM] Orange democratic movement
    |:Murule

Wards

References

External links 
Dujis Constituency Online (unofficial)
Map of the constituency

Constituencies in Mandera County
Constituencies in North Eastern Province (Kenya)
1966 establishments in Kenya
Constituencies established in 1966